The women's javelin throw at the 1962 British Empire and Commonwealth Games as part of the athletics programme was held at the Perry Lakes Stadium on Thursday 29 November 1962.

Records

Final

References

Women's javelin throw
1962